Mario César Ramírez Estigarribia (born 25 May 1965, in Limpio, Paraguay) is a former football defender and coach.

Career

As player
Ramírez started his career in the youth divisions of Club 1 de Mayo de Limpio and then moved to Club Fulgencio Yegros, also from the city of Limpio. His good performances caught the eyes of Club Sol de América of the Paraguayan 1st division, which signed him for five years. During his years at Sol de América, Ramírez won the 1st division title in 1986 and was runners-up with the team in 1988. He then went on to sign for Argentine side Textil Mandiyú in 1989 before returning to Paraguay to play for Olimpia Asunción where he won national and international titles such as the Copa Libertadores and the Supercopa Sudamericana in 1990. He was then transferred to CD Veracruz of Mexico and played for a year and a half in the team before having contractual problems that kept him off the fields from over 2 years. After sorting out his contract problem he was released by Veracruz and in 1998 he returned to Paraguay to play for teams like Sportivo Luqueño, Tembetary, Guaraní and 12 de Octubre before retiring.

Ramírez also served for the Paraguay national team, playing the 1993 Copa América tournament.

As coach
After retirement he became a coach and managed teams like Club 12 de Octubre, Club Martín Ledesma and Club Silvio Pettirossi. His nickname is "RoboCop".

Titles

As player

References

1965 births
Living people
People from Limpio
Paraguayan footballers
Club Sol de América footballers
Club Olimpia footballers
C.D. Veracruz footballers
Textil Mandiyú footballers
Sportivo Luqueño players
Club Guaraní players
Copa Libertadores-winning players
Paraguay international footballers
Paraguayan football managers
1993 Copa América players
Association football defenders